Dizaj-e Morteza Kandi (also Romanized as Dīzaj-e Morteẕā Qolī Kandī; also known as Mūsá Qolī Kandī) is a village in Qarah Su Rural District, in the Central District of Khoy County, West Azerbaijan Province, Iran. At the 2006 census, its population was 785, in 167 families.

References 

Populated places in Khoy County